Bandaraya LRT station is an elevated rapid transit station in central Kuala Lumpur, Malaysia. The station is on the common route shared by the Ampang Line and Sri Petaling Line (originally known as STAR Line). The station was opened on 16 December 1996, as part of the first phase of the STAR system's opening, along with 13 adjoining stations along the Sultan Ismail to Ampang route.

The station stands between the eastern banks of the Gombak River and an intersection between Jalan Raja Laut, a major thoroughfare along the Gombak River, and Jalan Isfahan. The station is the southernmost station along the Gombak River. The station is also within close proximity of several shopping complexes, the present Kuala Lumpur City Hall building, the Bank Negara headquarters, and Little India Precinct.

The station is some 140 m from the  Bank Negara station, a KTM Komuter station, to which it is linked by a footbridge. It was the first station on the line to have an interchange with another railway system and, prior to the opening of Kelana Jaya Line and remaining phases of the STAR lines, the only station of this kind, although there was no network integration in terms of fares or ticketing. Bandaraya is also close to bus stops along Jalan Raja Laut, Jalan Dang Wangi and Jalan Tuanku Abdul Rahman.

Station layout
The station is a typical elevated Ampang and Sri Petaling Lines station, the platform level is on the topmost floor, consisting of two sheltered side platforms along a double tracked line; there is a single concourse housing ticketing facilities between the ground level and the platform level. The design is similar to that of most other stations on the line, with multi-tiered roofs supported by latticed frames, and white plastered walls and pillars. All levels are linked by stairways and escalators.

Around the station
 SOGO KL
 Jalan Tuanku Abdul Rahman
 CIMB Bank
 United Overseas Bank
 Coliseum Theatre
 DBKL headquarters – the namesake of the station

Gallery

See also

 List of rail transit stations in Klang Valley

Ampang Line
Railway stations opened in 1996
1996 establishments in Malaysia